() or  (often  in Italian; ;) is a shrubland biome in the Mediterranean region, typically consisting of densely growing evergreen shrubs.

Maquis is characterized by plants of the family Lamiaceae, genera Laurus and Myrtus, and species Olea europaea, Ceratonia siliqua, and Ficus carica. It is similar to garrigue.

See also
Mining maquis
 Maquis (disambiguation)
 Mediterranean forests, woodlands, and scrub

References

External links
 
 
 

Ecoregions of Europe
Ecoregions of Metropolitan France
Environment of the Mediterranean
Mediterranean forests, woodlands, and scrub
Palearctic ecoregions
Subshrubs
Flora of the Mediterranean Basin